The  Phoenix Super LPG Fuel Masters season was the sixth season of the franchise in the Philippine Basketball Association (PBA).

Key dates
March 14: The PBA Season 46 draft was held at the TV5 Media Center in Mandaluyong.

Draft picks

Roster

Philippine Cup

Eliminations

Standings

Game log

|-bgcolor=ffcccc
| 1
| July 17
| Magnolia
| L 73–80
| Matthew Wright (20)
| Jason Perkins (13)
| Matthew Wright (8)
| Ynares Sports Arena
| 0–1
|-bgcolor=ffcccc
| 2
| July 21
| NorthPort
| L 79–115
| Vic Manuel (26)
| Chua, Perkins, Wright (7)
| Aljun Melecio (4)
| Ynares Sports Arena
| 0–2
|-bgcolor=ccffcc
| 3
| July 24
| Alaska
| W 101–93
| Vic Manuel (26)
| Vic Manuel (12)
| RR Garcia (5)
| Ynares Sports Arena
| 1–2
|-bgcolor=ffcccc
| 4
| July 28
| Meralco
| L 80–91
| Matthew Wright (29)
| Nick Demusis (6)
| Jason Perkins (4)
| Ynares Sports Arena
| 1–3

|-bgcolor=ffcccc
| 5
| August 1
| TNT
| L 80–84
| Matthew Wright (15)
| Vic Manuel (9)
| Chris Banchero (5)
| Ynares Sports Arena
| 1–4

|-bgcolor=ccffcc
| 6
| September 2
| Rain or Shine
| W 78–77
| Garcia, Perkins (18)
| Perkins, Wright (12)
| Perkins, Wright (5)
| DHVSU Gym
| 2–4
|-bgcolor=ffcccc
| 7
| September 4
| NLEX
| L 76–94
| Vic Manuel (13)
| Jason Perkins (12)
| Banchero, Wright (6)
| DHVSU Gym
| 2–5
|-bgcolor=ccffcc
| 8
| September 9
| Terrafirma
| W 96–84
| Jason Perkins (28)
| Nick Demusis (9)
| RR Garcia (7)
| DHVSU Gym
| 3–5
|-bgcolor=ccffcc
| 9
| September 11
| Blackwater
| W 114–92
| Chua, Perkins (17)
| Justin Chua (9)
| Garcia, Wright (6)
| DHVSU Gym
| 4–5
|-bgcolor=ffcccc
| 10
| September 15
| Barangay Ginebra
| L 87–94
| Jason Perkins (30)
| Chua, Perkins (8)
| Chris Banchero (7)
| DHVSU Gym
| 4–6
|-bgcolor=ffcccc
| 11
| September 17
| San Miguel
| L 80–110
| Jason Perkins (18)
| Jason Perkins (9)
| Matthew Wright (10)
| DHVSU Gym
| 4–7

Playoffs

Bracket

Game log

|-bgcolor=ffcccc
| 1
| September 25
| Barangay Ginebra
| L 85–95
| Jason Perkins (15)
| Jake Pascual (11)
| Matthew Wright (8)
| DHVSU Gym
| 0–1

Governors' Cup

Eliminations

Standings

Game log

|-bgcolor=ccffcc
| 1
| December 9
| Terrafirma
| W 103–100
| Paul Harris (24)
| Paul Harris (15)
| Matthew Wright (10)
| Ynares Sports Arena
| 1–0
|-bgcolor=ccffcc
| 2
| December 11
| Blackwater
| W 110–99
| Chris Banchero (23)
| Paul Harris (16)
| Matthew Wright (9)
| Ynares Sports Arena
| 2–0
|-bgcolor=ffcccc
| 3
| December 16
| Rain or Shine
| L 88–90
| Paul Harris (17)
| Paul Harris (20)
| Paul Harris (6)
| Smart Araneta Coliseum
| 2–1
|-bgcolor=ffcccc
| 4
| December 19
| Barangay Ginebra
| L 121–125 (OT)
| Paul Harris (26)
| Nick Demusis (9)
| Matthew Wright (8)
| Smart Araneta Coliseum
| 2–2
|-bgcolor=ccffcc
| 5
| December 25
| NLEX
| W 102–93
| Matthew Wright (23)
| Matthew Wright (9)
| Jazul, Perkins, Wright (4)
| Smart Araneta Coliseum4,843
| 3–2

|-bgcolor=ccffcc
| 6
| February 13, 2022
| TNT
| W 93–92
| Matthew Wright (27)
| Dominique Sutton (10)
| Matthew Wright (10)
| Smart Araneta Coliseum
| 4–2
|-bgcolor=ffcccc
| 7
| February 19, 2022
| Magnolia
| L 83–103
| Matthew Wright (18)
| Sean Manganti (9)
| Matthew Wright (6)
| Smart Araneta Coliseum
| 4–3
|-bgcolor=ffcccc
| 8
| February 23, 2022
| San Miguel
| L 99–104
| Matthew Wright (24)
| Jake Pascual (11)
| Matthew Wright (7)
| Ynares Center
| 4–4
|-bgcolor=ffcccc
| 9
| February 26, 2022
| NorthPort
| L 93–101
| Dominique Sutton (23)
| Dominique Sutton (12)
| Matthew Wright (6)
| Ynares Center
| 4–5

|-bgcolor=ccffcc
| 10
| March 3, 2022
| Alaska
| W 104–99
| Matthew Wright (26)
| Du'Vaughn Maxwell (21)
| Matthew Wright (11)
| Smart Araneta Coliseum
| 5–5
|-bgcolor=ffcccc
| 11
| March 11, 2022
| Meralco
| L 90–109
| Du'Vaughn Maxwell (26)
| Du'Vaughn Maxwell (12)
| Matthew Wright (10)
| Smart Araneta Coliseum
| 5–6

Playoffs

Bracket

Game log

|-bgcolor=ccffcc
| 1
| March 13, 2022
| NorthPort
| W 101–98
| Du'Vaughn Maxwell (31)
| Du'Vaughn Maxwell (13)
| Maxwell, Wright (5)
| Smart Araneta Coliseum
| 1–0

|-bgcolor=ffcccc
| 1
| March 18, 2022
| Magnolia
| L 88–127
| Du'Vaughn Maxwell (32)
| Maxwell, Perkins (9)
| Matthew Wright (8)
| Smart Araneta Coliseum
| 0–1

Transactions

Free agency

Signings

Trades

Pre-season

Mid-season

Governors' Cup

Recruited imports

References

Phoenix Super LPG Fuel Masters seasons
Phoenix Super LPG Fuel Masters Season, 2021